Athanase  is a given name. Notable people with the name include:

Antoine-Athanase Royer-Collard (1768–1825), French physician born in the village of Sompuis, département Marne
Athanase Coquerel (disambiguation)
Athanase David (1882–1953), Canadian lawyer, politician, and businessman
Prix Athanase-David, annual literary award, part of the Prix du Québec
Athanase Gaudet (1848–1888), farmer, merchant and political figure in Quebec
Athanase Josué Coquerel (1820–1875), French Protestant theologian, son of Athanase Laurent Charles Coquerel
Athanase Laurent Charles Coquerel (1795–1868), French Protestant theologian, born in Paris
Athanase Seromba (born 1963), Rwandan priest found guilty of genocide and crimes against humanity committed in the Rwandan genocide
Athanase-Charles-Marie Charette de la Contrie (1832–1911), French royalist military commander
Charles Athanase Walckenaer (1771–1852), French civil servant and scientist
Jean Charles Athanase Peltier (1785–1845), French physicist
Jean-Athanase Sicard (1872–1929), French neurologist and radiologist
Panayis Athanase Vagliano (1814–1902), merchant and shipowner, acclaimed as the father of modern Greek